The 2015 London Broncos season was the thirty-sixth in the club's history and their first season in the Super League. Competing in 2015 Kingstone Press Championship, the club was coached by Joey Grima, before being replaced by his assistant Andrew Henderson in March. They finishing in 7th place, reaching the Championship Shield Final and reaching the Fourth Round of the 2015 Challenge Cup.

It was their second since moving to the Hive Stadium. They exited the Challenge Cup with a defeat by the Leigh Centurions.

2015 milestones

2015 squad

2015 tables

Regular season

Championship Shield

The third of the three "Super 8" groups saw teams finishing 5th to 12th in the regular Championship table. Like the Super League 8's, these teams retained their original points and played 7 extra games, with the teams finishing in the top 4 places after these extra games contesting playoffs similar to Super League, with 1st v 4th and 2nd vs 3rd, with the winners contesting the Championship Shield Grand Final.
The two teams finishing at the bottom of this Super 8s group (7th and 8th) were relegated to the League 1 2016 season, and replaced by the two 2015 League One promoted sides.

(Q) Qualified for the Semi Final
(R) Relegated to League 1

References

London Broncos seasons
London Broncos season
2015 in rugby league by club
2015 in English rugby league